Miguel Machinandiarena was an Argentine film producer, best remembered for founding Estudios San Miguel in 1937.

Films 
La serpiente de cascabel
Madame Bovary (1947 film)

References

External links
 

Argentine film producers